Alfaprostol is a bioactive analog of prostaglandin F2α.  Alfaprostol is a luteolytic agent used injectably for scheduling of estrus in mares for purposes of planned breeding. It is also used for treating of postweaning anestrus in economically important farm animals. For these purposes, alfaprostol is more potent than naturally occurring prostaglandin F2α.

References

 

Prostaglandins
Cyclohexyl compounds